Donker is a Dutch surname. Donker means "dark, somber" in modern Dutch, and was probably a character reference. Alternative spellings include Donkers, (de) Doncker and Donckers. People with these surnames include:

Donker
Ad Donker (1933–2002), Dutch-born South-African publisher
 (born 1965), Dutch journalist
 (born 1940), Dutch illustrator
Greetje Donker (1906–1993), Dutch dancer and choreographer
Leendert Antonie Donker (1899–1956), Dutch politician
Pieter Donker (1635–1668), Dutch painter
Donker Curtius
Dirk Donker Curtius (1792–1864), Dutch politician and Minister of Justice
Janus Henricus Donker Curtius (1813–1879), Dutch diplomat and last director at Dejima
 (1778–1858), Dutch politician
Doncker
Herman Doncker (1600–1666), Dutch painter
 (1874–1917), Dutch illustrator and shadow puppeteer
Tomás Doncker, American blues guitarist and singer
De Doncker
Eric De Doncker (born 1962), Belgian racing driver
 (born 1958), Belgian youth author
Donckers
Karin Donckers (born 1962), Belgian equestrian

Dutch-language surnames